Horatio Nelson, 1st Viscount Nelson (1758–1805) was a Royal Navy vice admiral. Admiral Nelson may also refer to:

Charles P. Nelson (admiral) (1877–1935), U.S. Navy rear admiral
Edward Nelson Jr. (1931–2018), U.S. Coast Guard rear admiral
Richard A. Nelson (born 1941), U.S. Navy vice admiral
Robert T. Nelson (born 1936), U.S. Coast Guard vice admiral
William T. Nelson (1908–1994), U.S. Navy rear admiral

See also
Philip Nelson-Ward (1866–1937), British Royal Navy admiral